The 1975 Yale Bulldogs football team represented Yale University in the 1975 NCAA Division I football season.  The Bulldogs were led by 11th-year head coach Carmen Cozza, played their home games at the Yale Bowl and finished in third place in the Ivy League with a 5–2 record, 7–2 overall.

On November 22, 1975, Harvard and Yale entered "The Game" tied for first place with identical 5–1 records. The game was played at the Yale Bowl in front of 66,846 spectators. Yale took a 7–0 lead on a five-yard option run by quarterback Stone Phillips (later known for his work as a television news reporter). Harvard rallied with 10 points in the second half to win the game and become the 1975 Ivy League champion.

The team's statistical leaders included Stone Phillips with 969 passing yards, halfback Don Gesicki with 873 rushing yards and 42 points scored, and split end Gary Fencik (who later played 12 years in the NFL) with 729 receiving yards.

Linebacker John Smoot was the team captain and also received the Ted Blair Award as the team's most valuable player.  Eight Yale players received first-team All-Ivy honors: Fencik, Gesicki, Smoot, defensive end Scott Keller, offensive tackle Charlie Palmer, offensive guard Victor Staffieri, punter Mike Southworth, and MB John Cahill.

One Yale player was selected in the 1976 NFL Draft: Gary Fencik by the Miami Dolphins in the 10th round, 281st overall pick.

Schedule

References

Yale
Yale Bulldogs football seasons
Yale Bulldogs football